American rapper Silkk The Shocker has released five studio albums, eight compilation albums, two soundtrack album, one mixtape, nine singles,  and eight music videos. His music has been released on Priority Records, Koch Records & EMI along with his former record label's No Limit Records, The New No Limit, Guttar Music & his current label No Limit Forever.

Albums

Studio albums

Soundtrack albums

Mixtapes

Compilation albums

Singles

As lead artist

As featured artist

References

Hip hop discographies
Discographies of American artists